Preah Bat Choan Chum Commune is a khum (commune) in Kiri Vong District, Takéo Province, Cambodia.

Administration 
As of 2019, Preah Bat Choan Chum Commune has 9 phums (villages) as follows.

References 

Communes of Takéo province
Kiri Vong District